Edelweiss were an Austrian electronic dance music group consisting of remixers Martin Gletschermayer, Matthias Schweger and Walter Werzowa. The group is best known for their 1988 worldwide hit "Bring Me Edelweiss", and their European hit "Starship Edelweiss".  

Edelweiss reached the number one position with their hit "Bring Me Edelweiss," featuring Austrian folk singer Maria Mathis, who also did the live performances (and later recorded an updated version in 1999). The single was a hit in many European countries, supposedly by following the instructions given in The KLF's book The Manual. Borrowing large parts of its melody from ABBA's "SOS" and Indeep's "Last Night a DJ Saved My Life", the song humorously targeted Austrian ski resorts and yodeling and sold five million copies worldwide. Bill Drummond, one of the authors of The Manual (How to Have a Number One the Easy Way), mentioned the group in the epilogue of the German release of the book, which was originally published in 1989 (in English).

Discography

Singles

Album

References

Austrian electronic music groups
Dance music groups
Parodies of Star Trek
Music based on Star Trek